Kautz is a surname. Notable people with the surname include:

Albert Kautz (1839–1907), American naval officer, born at Georgetown, Ohio
August Kautz (1828–1895), German-American soldier and Union Army cavalry officer during the American Civil War
Christian Kautz (1913–1948), auto racing driver from Switzerland
Jacob Kautz (1500–1532), Anabaptist who posted seven theses to the door of the Worms Cathedral in 1527
Julius Kautz (1829–1909), Hungarian economist

See also
Kautz Creek, tributary of the Nisqually River in the Mount Rainier National Park of Washington
Kautz Creek Falls, waterfall on Kautz Creek in the Mount Rainier National Park of Washington
Kautz Glacier, narrow glacier on the southern flank of Mount Rainier in Washington
Kautz Family YMCA Archives collects the historical records of its national organization, the YMCA of the USA
Kautz filter, named after William H. Kautz, is a fixed-pole traversal filter, published in 1954
Kautz graph, directed graph of degree M and dimension N + 1, which has (M + 1)MN vertices labeled by all possible strings of length N + 1 which are composed of characters chosen from an alphabet A containing M + 1 distinct symbols, subject to the condition that adjacent characters in the string cannot be equal…
Wilson-Kautz Raid, cavalry operation in south central Virginia in late June 1864 during the American Civil War

German-language surnames
Surnames from nicknames